The Men's Handball Tournament at the 1995 Pan American Games was held from March 16 to March 25, 1995 in Mar del Plata, Argentina. The women competed from March 15 to March 24.

Men's tournament

Final ranking

Awards

Women's tournament

Final ranking

Awards

Medal table

References

External links
 Results
 sports123

Events at the 1995 Pan American Games
P
1995
Handball in Argentina